Rubí, is a Mexican telenovela television series produced by Televisa that was originally broadcast by Telesistema Mexicano in 1968.

Cast 
Fanny Cano - Rubí Pérez Carvajal
Antonio Medellín - Alejandro del Villar
Carlos Fernández - César Valdés López
Irma Lozano - Maribel Dubois
Alicia Montoya - Doña Refugio Carvajal Vda. de Pérez
Antonio Raxel - Julio Dubois
María Eugenia Ríos - Cristina Pérez Carvajal
Velia Vejar - Eloísa

References

External links 

Mexican telenovelas
Televisa telenovelas
Spanish-language telenovelas
1968 telenovelas
1968 Mexican television series debuts
1968 Mexican television series endings
Television shows based on comics